Kedung Sepur (or Kedungsepur) is a commuter rail line in Central Java, Indonesia operated by Kereta Api Indonesia (KAI), serving Semarang Poncol Station (in Semarang)–Ngrombo Station (in Grobogan Regency) route and vice versa. The service name is taken from initials of cities and regencies forming Semarang metropolitan area: Kendal, Demak, Ungaran, Salatiga, Semarang, and Purwodadi.

Kedung Sepur is using Nippon Sharyo-built MCW DMU stock for its service.

History 
Kedung Sepur was first operated on 28 September 2014 coincide with the anniversary of KAI, serving Weleri Station to Gubug. Due to the lack of enthusiasts at the time, the service was moved to Semarang Poncol-Ngrombo route starting on 1 February 2015.

References 

Passenger rail transport in Indonesia
Transport in Central Java
Semarang